Here Comes the Band is a 1935 American comedy film directed by Paul Sloane and written by Paul Sloane, Ralph Spence and Victor Mansfield. The film stars Ted Lewis and His Orchestra, Ted Lewis, Virginia Bruce, Harry Stockwell, Ted Healy and Nat Pendleton. The film was released on August 30, 1935, by Metro-Goldwyn-Mayer.

Plot
A songwriter sues for copyright infringement by an unscrupulous music producer.

Cast 
Ted Lewis and His Orchestra as Orchestra
Ted Lewis as Ted Lowry
Virginia Bruce as Margaret
Harry Stockwell as Ollie Watts
Ted Healy as 'Happy' 
Nat Pendleton as 'Piccolo Pete'
Addison Richards as Colonel Wallace
Donald Cook as Don Trevor
George McFarland as Spanky Lowry 
Robert McWade as Judge
Henry Kolker as Simmon's Attorney
Robert Gleckler as Simmons
Richard Tucker as Jim 
Bert Roach as Drummer in Band
Tyler Brooke as Dentist
Billy Gilbert as Sneezer
Ferdinand Gottschalk as Armand de Valerie
May Beatty as Miss Doyle
Florence Gill As Chicken Woman
Charles Lane as Mr. Scurry

References

External links 
 

1935 films
American comedy films
1935 comedy films
Metro-Goldwyn-Mayer films
American black-and-white films
Films scored by Edward Ward (composer)
Films directed by Paul Sloane
1930s English-language films
1930s American films